Borsonella omphale is a species of sea snail, a marine gastropod mollusk in the family Borsoniidae.

Description
The slender shell is acute, with eight flattish whorls exclusive of the (lost) nucleus. Its color is white covered by a very light olive gray periostracum. The suture is distinct. The fasciole is hardly impressed. The spiral sculpture consists of obscure striae, sparser on the base. The axial sculpture consists of incremental faint lines arcuate on the anal fasciole. The aperture is narrow. The anal sulcus is wide and moderately deep. The outer lip is thin, prominently arcuate in front of the periphery. The inner lip is erased. The columella is strong with a single fold near the
body ; attenuated in front. The siphonal canal is short.

The height of the shell is 16 mm ; of the body whorl: 10 mm; diameter: 6 mm.

Distribution
This species occurs in the Pacific Ocean off Santa Barbara Island, California.

References

 Tucker, J.K. 2004 Catalog of recent and fossil turrids (Mollusca: Gastropoda). Zootaxa 682:1–1295.
 McLean J.H. (1996). The Prosobranchia. In: Taxonomic Atlas of the Benthic Fauna of the Santa Maria Basin and Western Santa Barbara Channel. The Mollusca Part 2 – The Gastropoda. Santa Barbara Museum of Natural History. volume 9: 1–160

External links

omphale
Gastropods described in 1919